HD 222093 is a double star in the equatorial constellation of Aquarius. It has an orange hue and is visible to the naked eye with an apparent visual magnitude of 5.68. The system is located at a distance of approximately 293 light years from the Sun based on parallax, but is drifting closer with a radial velocity of −13 km/s.

The primary component is an aging K-type giant star with a stellar classification of K0III, which indicates it has exhausted the supply of hydrogen at its core then cooled and expanded. At present it has ten times the Sun's radius. This is a red clump giant, which indicates it is on the horizontal branch and is generating energy through helium fusion at its core. It is around three billion years old with 1.5 times the mass of the Sun. The star is radiating fifty times the Sun's luminosity from its swollen photosphere at an effective temperature of 4,853 K.

References

External links
 Image HD 222093

K-type giants
Horizontal-branch stars
Double stars
Aquarius (constellation)
Durchmusterung objects
222093
116591
8958